Veronica Lisi (born 6 October 1987) is an Italian rower. She competed in the women's quadruple sculls event at the 2020 Summer Olympics.

References

External links
 

1987 births
Living people
Italian female rowers
Olympic rowers of Italy
Rowers at the 2020 Summer Olympics
Sportspeople from Padua